Gereb Bi’ati is a reservoir located near Mekelle in the Tigray Region in Ethiopia. The earthen dam that holds the reservoir was built in 2000 by SAERT.

Dam characteristics 
 Dam height: 17 metres
 Dam crest length: 578 metres
 Spillway width: 40 metres

Capacity 
 Original capacity: 1005841 m³
 Dead storage: 232728 m³
 Reservoir area: 17 ha
 Designed irrigated area: 88 ha

Environment 
The catchment of the reservoir is 9.71 km² large, with a perimeter of 14.24 km and a length of 4960 metres. Due to the possibility to by-pass sediment-laden water, the reservoir suffers from less rapid siltation. The lithology of the catchment is Agula Shale and Mekelle Dolerite. Part of the water that could be used for irrigation is lost through seepage; the positive side-effect is that this contributes to groundwater recharge.

References 

Reservoirs in Ethiopia
2000 establishments in Ethiopia
Tigray Region
Agriculture in Ethiopia
Water in Ethiopia